Trends in Plant Science is a peer-reviewed scientific journal published by Elsevier.

Abstracting and indexing
The journal is abstracted and indexed in:
Science Citation Index Expanded
Scopus
Chemical Abstracts
Embase
MEDLINE
According to the Journal Citation Reports, the journal has a 2020 impact factor of 18.313.

References

External links

English-language journals
Elsevier academic journals
Botany journals